Major Hugh Boyd Casey (November 30, 1925 – January 11, 1952) is the namesake of the U.S. Army  Camp Casey installation in South Korea, named and officially dedicated in 1952 in his memory.  Casey  was the son of General Hugh John Casey and was killed after surviving combat for almost two years with the 7th Infantry, in a non-hostile airplane crash during the Korean War while serving in the position of aide-de-camp to the 3d Infantry Division Commander.  He enlisted in the Army during World War II and served in several South Pacific campaigns. After the war, he was commissioned as a regular Army officer.

Early life and family
Casey was born in Auburn, Alabama. Casey's father, Major General Hugh John Casey, served on the personal staff of General of the Army Douglas MacArthur as his chief engineer during World War II. Casey's sister, Patricia Adams Casey, married Frank Butner Clay, who retired from the U.S. Army as a major general in 1973.

Casey enrolled at Rensselaer Polytechnic Institute in September 1943 to study civil engineering but left the institute in early 1944 to enlist in the army.

Military career
In World War II he was active in the Leyte and Luzon campaigns in the Philippines, for which he received two Silver Star medals.

In August 1945 he was a member of the 808th Engineering Aviation Battalion serving in Manila. After the war, Casey was involved in engineering projects for the U.S. Army in Japan while stationed at Haneda airdrome near Tokyo. He was the project engineer of Washington Heights and Grant Heights housing developments for occupying forces in Tokyo. In 1948 he was commissioned to the Regular Army and stationed at Fort Devens. In 1950, he led a group of expert mine sweepers sent to South Amboy, New Jersey to help cleanup live mines which were in the disaster area after the explosion of an ammunition barge in that city.

Korean War
In Korea, he was a member of the Company G, 7th Infantry Regiment, 3rd Infantry Division. He was awarded a Silver Star for his actions during the withdrawal from the Hungman Beachhead in 1951 and received a battlefield promotion to captain. As a captain, he was made commander of Company G. Shortly after he served as a senior aide to Major General Williston B. Palmer in command of the 10th Corps. He was killed in the crash of a light Army aircraft near Tong Du Chon (Romanization of Korean 동두천 has changed spelling to Dongducheon), South Korea on January 11, 1952. For his leadership and valor, Casey was awarded the Distinguished Service Cross, the Combat Infantryman Badge, the Korean Service Medal and the United Nations Service Medal.

Legacy
Casey is buried at Arlington National Cemetery. Shortly after his death, the 1st Corps Reserve training area in Korea was named Camp Casey in his honor. The Hugh B. Casey memorial Award was established in his honor for the "most outstanding soldier of the 7th Infantry Regiment" of the 3rd Infantry Division.

References

External links
 Camp Casey

1925 births
1952 deaths
People from Auburn, Alabama
Military personnel from Alabama
Rensselaer Polytechnic Institute
United States Army personnel of World War II
United States Army personnel of the Korean War
United States Army officers
Recipients of the Distinguished Service Cross (United States)
Victims of aviation accidents or incidents in South Korea
Burials at Arlington National Cemetery
American military personnel killed in the Korean War